Emanuele Rovini (born 15 March 1995) is an Italian footballer who plays as a forward.

Career
Born in Marina di Cecina, Cecina, Tuscany, Rovini started his career with Tuscan team Empoli F.C. In July 2012, Rovini was signed by Serie A club Udinese in a co-ownership deal for €800,000. Rovini spent the 2012–13 season with the Empoli youth–reserve side. During the 2013–14 season he joined the Udinese youth–reserve team.

In the summer of 2014, Rovini returned to Empoli on a temporary deal. He wore the number 95 shirt for the first team. Rovini failed to play a single game during the 2014–15 Serie A season. On 30 January 2015, Rovini was signed by SPAL, and he made his club and professional debut during the 2014–15 Lega Pro season.

In June 2015 Udinese acquired Rovini's remaining 50% registration rights from Empoli for an undisclosed fee.

References

1995 births
Living people
Italian footballers
Italy youth international footballers
Udinese Calcio players
Empoli F.C. players
S.P.A.L. players
U.S. Pistoiese 1921 players
F.C. Pro Vercelli 1892 players
Association football forwards
Sportspeople from the Province of Livorno
Footballers from Tuscany
Serie B players
Serie C players
People from Cecina, Tuscany